Terryville, Kentucky is a populated place in Lawrence County, Kentucky. Historically it was the site of a post office and a school.

References

Lawrence County, Kentucky